Trouble in Morocco is a 1937 American adventure war film directed by Ernest B. Schoedsack and starring Jack Holt.

Cast
Jack Holt ... Paul Cluett
Mae Clarke	... Linda Lawrence
Paul Hurst	... Tiger Malone
C. Henry Gordon ... Captain Nardant
Harold Huber ... Palmo
Oscar Apfel ... DeRouget
Bradley Page ... 	Branenok
Victor Varconi	...  Kamaroff

References

External links

1937 films
1937 drama films
American drama films
Films directed by Ernest B. Schoedsack
French Foreign Legion in popular culture
Columbia Pictures films
American black-and-white films
Films set in Morocco
Films set in deserts
1930s American films